Bioelectromagnetics is a peer-reviewed scientific journal published by Wiley-Liss that specializes in  articles about the biological effects from and applications of electromagnetic fields in biology and medicine. It is the official journal of the Bioelectromagnetics Society, the European Bioelectromagnetics Association, and the Society for Physical Regulation in Biology and Medicine.

Abstracting and indexing
The journal is abstracted and indexed in Medline, searchable via PubMed and indexed in Index medicus. According to the Journal Citation Reports, the journal has a 2020 impact factor of 2.010.

See also 
Bioelectrochemistry (journal)

References

External links

Biophysics journals
Biotechnology journals
Publications established in 1980
Wiley (publisher) academic journals
Bioelectromagnetics